Yo with macron (Ё̄ ё̄; italics: Ё̄ ё̄) is a letter of the Cyrillic script.

Yo with macron is used in the Even, Evenki, Nanai, Negidal, Kildin Sami, Selkup and Ulch languages.

See also
Cyrillic characters in Unicode

Cyrillic letters with diacritics
Letters with diaeresis
Letters with macron